Stefan Bellmont (born 3 May 1989) is a Swiss professional darts player who competes in Professional Darts Corporation and World Darts Federation events.

He made his PDC European Tour debut in the 2019 European Darts Grand Prix, where he lost 6–2 to Jeffrey de Zwaan.

He has also qualified for the 2019 Czech Darts Open.

References

External links

1989 births
Living people
Swiss darts players
People from Cham, Switzerland
Sportspeople from the canton of Zug